The Invitation to William was a letter sent by seven notable English nobles, later called "the Immortal Seven", to stadtholder William III, Prince of Orange, received by him on 30 June 1688 (Julian calendar, 10 July Gregorian calendar). In England, the heir apparent to the throne, James Francis Edward Stuart, had just been born to the unpopular King James II of England, and baptised a Catholic. The letter asked William, who was a nephew and son-in-law of James II, to use military intervention to force the king to make his eldest daughter, Mary, William's Protestant wife, his heir. The letter alleged that the newborn prince was an impostor.

The letter informed William that if he were to land in England with a small army, the signatories and their allies would rise up and support him.  The Invitation briefly rehashed the grievances against King James. It claimed that the king's son was supposititious (fraudulently substituted) and that the English people generally believed him to be so. The present consensus among historians is that he was almost certainly their real son. The letter deplored that William had sent a letter to James congratulating him for the birth of his son, and offered some brief strategy on the logistics of the proposed landing of troops. It was carried to William in The Hague by Rear Admiral Arthur Herbert (the later Lord Torrington) disguised as a common sailor, and identified by a secret code.

The invitation caused William to carry out his existing plans to land with a large Dutch army, culminating in the Glorious Revolution during which James was deposed and replaced by William and Mary as joint rulers. William and Mary had previously asked for such an invitation when William started to assemble an invasion force in April of that year. This request was done through secret correspondence that had been taking place since April 1687, between them and several leading English politicians, regarding how best to counter the pro-Catholic policies of James. William later justified his invasion by the fact that he was invited, which helped to disguise the military, cultural, and political impact that the Dutch regime had on England when his reign was unpopular and he feared a popular uprising.

The signatories were: 
Charles Talbot, Earl of Shrewsbury
William Cavendish, Earl of Devonshire
Thomas Osborne, Earl of Danby
Richard (Lumley), Viscount Lumley
Henry Compton, Bishop of London
Edward Russell, 1st Earl of Orford
Henry Sydney, 1st Earl of Romney (who wrote the Invitation)

Danby and Compton were generally considered to be Tories (court party), the other five as Whigs (country party).

After William's rise to power, five were elevated further in the peerage; Russell was made a peer with the mid-rank of earl; and Compton as Bishop of London had his suspension (for refusing to suspend strongly anti-Catholic reverend John Sharp), running into a third year, lifted and performed the coronation, granted lands in Maryland to his second cousin, and became a commissioner in revision of the litany.

Contents

The invitation declared:

References

Sources
 
 
 
 

Stuart England
1688 in England
1688 documents
Anti-Catholicism in England
Glorious Revolution
William III of England
17th-century documents